Association Sportive de Prix-lès-Mézières (commonly referred to as AS Prix-lès-Mézières) is a French football club based in Prix-lès-Mézières in the Champagne-Ardenne region. The club was founded on 24 July 1948 and currently plays in the Championnat National 3, the fifth tier of French football, after being promoted in 2019.

Managers 

 -2016 :  Sami Smaïli
 2016-2017 :  Farid Fouzari
 2017-01/2018 :  Teddy Pellerin
 01/2018-06/2018 :  Éric Luczkow
 2018-2021:  Laurent Billard
 2021-present:  Cédric Elzéard

References

External links
  

Association football clubs established in 1948
Football clubs in France
1948 establishments in France